The 2012 Hawaii Warriors football team represented the University of Hawaii at Manoa in the 2012 NCAA Division I FBS football season. They were led by first-year head coach Norm Chow and played their home games at Aloha Stadium. They were first year members of the Mountain West Conference. They finished the season 3–9, 1–7 in Mountain West play to finish in a tie for ninth place.

New head coach
The university hired Norm Chow, a native Hawaiian who had most recently served as the offensive coordinator at Utah, as its head coach in the 2011–12 offseason to replace the retiring Greg McMackin. With Chow's hiring, the Warriors abandoned the run and shoot offense that McMackin's predecessor June Jones installed and instead ran a pro-style offense.

Schedule

Game summaries

@ USC

Lamar

Nevada

@ BYU

@ San Diego State

New Mexico

@ Colorado State

@ Fresno State

Boise State

@ Air Force

UNLV

South Alabama

References

Hawaii
Hawaii Rainbow Warriors football seasons
Hawaii Warriors football